Rhytididae is a taxonomic family of medium-sized predatory air-breathing land snails, carnivorous terrestrial pulmonate gastropod molluscs in the superfamily Rhytidoidea. 

This family has two subfamilies:
 Chlamydephorinae Cockerell, 1935 (1903)
 Rhytidinae Pilsbry, 1893

Anatomy
In this family, the number of haploid chromosomes lies between 26 and 35 (according to the values in this table).

Distribution
This family of land snails has a range which extends from South Africa to New Guinea, some of the higher South Pacific islands, New Zealand and Australia.

The New Zealand genera include Delos, Delouagapia, Paryphanta, Powelliphanta, Rhytida, Wainuia and Schizoglossa. These, however, probably do not form a monophyletic group, as indicated by their differences in their size, shape and radular morphology.

Genera 
Genera within the family Rhytididae include:

 Amborhytida
 Austrorhytida
 Delos
 Delouagapia
 Diplomphalus
 Echotrida
 Hebridelos
 Macrocycloides
 Namoitena
 Nata
 Natalina
 Occirhenea
 Ougapia
 Paryphanta
Protorugosa
 Powelliphanta
 Prolesophanta
 Pseudomphalus Ancey, 1882
 Ptychorhytida
 Rhytida
 Rhytidarex
 Saladelos
 Schizoglossa
 Strangesta
 Tasmaphena
 Torresiropa
 Victaphanta
 Vitellidelos
 Wainuia

Life cycle 
Eggs of New Zealand's species are generally deposited in leaf mould. Eggs are usually laid from late October to early December, with exception in some species as Powelliphanta spedeni in March.

References

Further reading 

 Powell A. W. B. (1930) "The Paryphantidae of New Zealand: their hypothetical ancestry, with descriptions of new species and a new genus". Records of the Auckland Institute and Museum 1: 17–56.
 Powell A. W. B. (1938) "The Paryphantidae of New Zealand No. IV". Records of the Auckland Institute and Museum ii(3): 133–150.
 Powell A. W. B. (1946) "The Paryphantidae of New Zealand. V. Further new species of Paryphanta, Wainuia, and Rhytida". Records of the Auckland Institute and Museum 3: 99–134.
 Smith B. J. 1998. Family Rhytididae. In: Beesley P. L., Ross G. J. B. & Wells A. ed. Mollusca: the southern synthesis. Fauna of Australia. Vol. 5. Melbourne, CSIRO Publishing. Pp. 1091–1093.
 Spencer H. G., Brook F. J. & Kenned M. (March 2006) "Phylogeography of Kauri Snails and their allies from Northland, New Zealand (Mollusca: Gastropoda: Rhytididae: Paryphantinae)". Molecular Phylogenetics and Evolution 38(3): 835-842. 
 Te Punga M. T. (1953) "The Paryphantidae and a Cook Strait land bridge". New Zealand Journal of Science and Technology 35: 51–63.

External links